Atrial cross is the name given in the Mexican Colonial Conventual constructions, to a type of large cross made by the mendicant friars in the atriums of the churches, symbolically pointing to the center of the towns given their arrangement between the longitudinal and transverse axis of the atrium. As Arturo Schroeder Cordero cited in his article "The functions of the conventual atrium in the Mexican 16th century", the crosses were made in the beginning of wood and later in stone, since these functioned as lightning rods, as was the case of the huge atrial cross of the Convent of San José de los Naturales in Mexico City, which was split in two by a lightning in the early 16th century.

The atrial crosses are usually placed on a pedestal or socle; they have only the face of Christ, a cartouche with the legend INRI on its top, the marking of the three nails in Christ's hands and feet and the carving of the symbols of the Passion, such as the nails, the hammer with which they nailed Jesus, a rooster singing on the column of the Passion, the cilice of the scourge, the crown of thorns and the dice with which his executioners played to circumvent the clothes of Christ, among others. The decoration is usually of the fitomorphic type, with huge flowers of lis and other floral details in which the carving is inspired by indigenous elements and by being many of them made from a single core stone. A good number of atrial crosses are currently preserved in the colonial Mexican churches and there are others that are replicas.

It was sometimes used as reference points to measure distances between towns.

See also
 Christian cross

Bibliography 
 George Kubler. Mexican architecture of the sixteenth century. Mexico, FCE, 1982.
 Arturo Schroeder Cordero. "Las funciones del atrio conventual mexicano", in Conferencias del bicentenario de la fundación de la Escuela de Pintura, Escultura y Arquitectura. Mexico, UNAM-Faculty of Architecture, 1984.

Spanish Colonial architecture in Mexico
Roman Catholic churches in Mexico
Architectural elements
Church architecture